Mathias Bau Hansen (born 3 July 1993) is a Danish professional ice hockey forward who is currently playing for Herning Blue Fox in the Metal Ligaen (DEN).

Playing career
Bau Hansen made his Superisligaen debut playing with the Rødovre Mighty Bulls during the 2011–12 AL-Bank Ligaen season.

After three successful seasons with the Frederikshavn White Hawks, Bau Hansen captured the attention of North America, agreeing to a one-year AHL contract with the Hershey Bears, affiliate to the Washington Capitals on 20 June 2017. In his debut North American season with the Bears in 2017–18, Bau recorded 13 goals and 23 points in 58 games and notched five game-winning goals, tied for the most on the team.

On 9 May 2018, he was rewarded for a solid season by signing a one-year, two-way contract with the Washington Capitals.

After suffering a serious injury while participating with Denmark during the 2018 World Championships, Bau Hansen was initially ruled out of the beginning of the 2018–19 season, placed on the Capitals injured non-roster list. While taking a long recovery from broken ribs and a tear in his spleen, Bau Hansen was ruled out from the remainder of the season during February 2019 and returned to his native Denmark to continue his return to fitness.

With his contract concluded with the Capitals, Bau Hansen was not tendered a qualifying offer and was released as a free agent. On 16 July 2019, Bau Hansen returned to Europe in agreeing to a one-year contract with Austrian club, Dornbirn Bulldogs of the EBEL.

Career statistics

Regular season and playoffs

International

References

External links
 

1993 births
Living people
Danish ice hockey forwards
Dornbirn Bulldogs players
Frederikshavn White Hawks players
Herning Blue Fox players
Hershey Bears players
Rødovre Mighty Bulls players
People from Glostrup Municipality
Ice hockey players at the 2022 Winter Olympics
Olympic ice hockey players of Denmark
Sportspeople from the Capital Region of Denmark